Zavareh District is a district (bakhsh) in Ardestan County, Isfahan Province, Iran. At the 2006 census, its population was 12,747, in 3,629 families.  The District has one city: Zavareh. The District has two rural districts (dehestan): Rigestan Rural District and Sofla Rural District.

References 

Ardestan County
Districts of Isfahan Province